Magno dos Santos Ribeiro (born 30 October 1993), commonly known as Magno, is a Brazilian footballer who plays as a forward.

Career statistics

Club

Notes

References

1993 births
Living people
Brazilian footballers
Brazilian expatriate footballers
Sportspeople from Belém
Association football forwards
Campeonato Brasileiro Série C players
Campeonato Brasileiro Série B players
Liga Portugal 2 players
Londrina Esporte Clube players
Clube do Remo players
Paysandu Sport Club players
Leixões S.C. players
Parauapebas Futebol Clube players
FC Cascavel players
Brazilian expatriate sportspeople in Portugal
Expatriate footballers in Portugal